The Palyavaam is a river in the Chukotka Autonomous Okrug, Russian Far East.

There is a small populated place in its basin also called Palyavaam. The Humpback whitefish, the East Siberian Grayling, Pink salmon, Chum salmon and Arctic char, are some of the fish species found in its waters.

Course
It has its source in the Palyavaam Range of the Chukotka Mountains. The Palyavaam flows in a roughly westward direction and passes through the sparsely populated areas of Chukotka. Finally it flows into the Chaun close to its outflow into the East Siberian Sea, at the Chaunskaya Bay near Rytkuchi. 

The Palyavaam has numerous tributaries. The most important ones are the Elkakvun, Palyarynnat, Karpungveyem, Levtuttyveyem, Kookvyn, Vykvylvegyrgyn and Pekychyn.

See also
List of rivers of Russia

References

External links

   
 Tourism and environment

Rivers of Chukotka Autonomous Okrug
Drainage basins of the East Siberian Sea
Chukotka Mountains